Fish upon the Sky (also known as "Fish from the Sky, Fish upon the Sky") is a 2021 Thai boys' love television series starring Phuwin Tangsakyuen (Phuwin), Naravit Lertratkosum (Pond), Trai Nimtawat (Neo) and Thanawin Teeraphosukarn (Louis). The series is based on the novel of the same name created and written by JittiRain, whose also behind the hit novel-turned-series Theory of Love and 2gether: The Series (with its respective sequels Still 2gether and 2gether: The Movie)

Directed by Sakon Wongsinwiset (Golf) and produced by GMMTV, the series is one of sixteen television series of GMMTV's offering for 2021 during their "GMMTV 2021: The New Decade Begins" event on 3 December 2020. The series premiered on GMM 25 and LINE TV on 9 April 2021, airing on Fridays at 20:30 ICT and 22:30 ICT, respectively. It replaced the timeslot of A Tale of Thousand Stars on GMM25 The series concluded on 25 June 2021 and replaced by the rerun of 2gether: The Series and its sequel Still 2gether on its timeslot on GMM25. The series had an rerun from 25 September 2021 to 22 October 2021 every Fridays to Sundays at 8:30 pm on GMM25 replacing the rerun of its predecessor A Tale of Thousand Stars timeslot. The rerun concluded on 22 October 2021 and replaced by the new series Bad Buddy Series on its Friday timeslot and the rerun of I'm Tee, Me Too on its Saturday and Sunday timeslot on GMM25.

 Summary 
Pi is a nerdy, second-year dental student who secretly has a crush on Muang Nan: a kind-hearted, handsome, second-year pharmacy student. Together with Nan's warm personality, Pi's looks and confidence are not enough, and he feels helpless. After consulting his older brother, Duean, on what he could do better, Pi decides to change himself. With the help of Duean and his friends, Pi gets a makeover to transform into a handsome, stylish boy with enough courage to woo Muang Nan. When Pi finally has enough courage to approach his crush, he meets his love rival, Mork: a popular medicine student who is always on Muang Nan's side. 

Pi tries everything to surpass Mork and gain Nan's attention, but is not lucky enough to beat him. However, everything starts to change as Pi begins experiencing different feelings for Mork, further complicating the situation. Will he continue to try to show his feelings to Nan? Or will an in-denial love begin to blossom with Mork?

 Cast and characters 
Below is the cast of the series: 

 Main 
 Phuwin Tangsakyuen (Phuwin) as Pattawee "Pi" Panichapun - A nerdy and lousy second-year dentistry student. He is introverted, un-sporty, focused on his studies, and anti-social. He doesn't care about his appearance, and has thick glasses and braces that are the cause of bullying. Due to his desire to win Muang Nan over, he changes his appearance to be more attractive and fit for his crush. He will later deny his feelings for Mork, until an event occurs that leads to him suddenly accepting the feelings.
 Naravit Lertratkosum (Pond) as Sutthaya "Mork" Nithikornkul - A hot, cool, and handsome second-year medicine student who constantly likes to tease Pi to get his attention. He is Muang Nan's best friend, and has a longtime secret crush on Pi. It is later revealed that he is "A Guy from the Nearby Faculty", an anonymous Facebook account Pi messages and confides in. Due to this, he becomes Pi's love interest.
 Trai Nimtawat (Neo) as Dollawee "Duean" Panichapun - A sharp-tongued and tight-lipped fifth-year engineering student. The leader of the "Kitty Gang", Pi's second older brother, and later, Meen's love interest.
 Thanawin Teeraphosukarn (Louis) as Sittha "Meen" Nithikornkul - An innocent and cute first-year medicine student, Mork's younger brother, and later, Duean's love interest.
 Sahaphap Wongratch (Mix) as Muang Nan - A kind and popular second-year pharmacy student, Mork's best friend, and Pi's crush.

 The Kitty Gang 
 Thanawin Pholcharoenrat (Winny) as Koh - One of the leading members who is violent and super hot-headed.
 Thanaset Suriyapornchaikul (Euro) as Yok - The member who is a so-called "girl magnet" because of his "oppa" look and charisma.
 Chayapol Jutamas (AJ) as Jeans - The member who wants to be an actor to the point that he'd joined many casting auditions, but never got accepted.
 Kittipop Sereevichayasawat (Satang) as James - The member who loves reading mangas and playing mobile games, and that's why he is mistaken as mute.

 Supporting/Guest roles 
 Ployshompoo Supasap (Jan) as Bam (Ep. 8-9, 11-12) - A playful friend of Mork who secretly is in love with him, and later becomes Pi's rival. At the end, she becomes Koh's love interest.
 Phatchara Thabthong (Kapook) as Teacher Namphueng (Ep. 5–7) - The teacher in the Nakhon Nayong province, who has caught the romantic attention of all of the "Kitty Gang" members.
 Phromphiriya Thongputtaruk (Papang) as Wan (Ep. 7) - A ER doctor, and the eldest brother of Duean and Pi.
 Darina Bunchu (Nancy) as Prik Pao (Ep. 4-12)- One of the Yaoi Girls who loyally shipped Pi and Mork. 
 Thawatchai Petchsuk (Yourboy Nuree) as Kluea Kang (Ep. 4-12) - One of the Yaoi Girls, who first shipped on Pi and Mork, but because of having conflict with Pi and Prik Pao began shipping Mork and Bam.
 Chotipat Surasawat (Jeng) as Phu (Ep. 9) - Duean's junior in the engineering faculty.

 Episodes 

 Reception 
In the table below,  represent the lowest ratings and  represents the highest rating.

 Soundtracks 

 Virtual live fan meeting 
On 3 August 2021, months after the series ended, GMMTV announced on its social media platforms that the series will have its first live virtual fan meeting entitled "Fish upon the Sky Live Fan Meeting: A Sky Full of Fish"' wherein, the main characters (Phuwin Tangsakyuen, Naravit Lertratkosum (Pond), Trai Nimtawat (Neo), Thanawin Teeraphosukarn (Louis) and Sahaphap Wongratch (Mix)) are part of the said event. It occurred on 4 September 2021.

References

External links 
 Fish Upon The Sky  on LINE TV
 GMMTV

2020s LGBT-related comedy television series
2020s LGBT-related drama television series
2021 Thai television series debuts
2021 Thai television series endings
GMM 25 original programming
Television series by GMMTV
Thai boys' love television series
Thai romantic comedy television series